The Kirkwood–Buff (KB) solution theory, due to John G. Kirkwood and Frank P. Buff, links macroscopic (bulk) properties to microscopic (molecular) details. Using statistical mechanics, the KB theory derives thermodynamic quantities from pair correlation functions between all molecules in a multi-component solution. The KB theory proves to be a valuable tool for validation of molecular simulations, as well as for the molecular-resolution elucidation of the mechanisms underlying various physical processes. For example, it has numerous applications in biologically relevant systems.

The reverse process is also possible; the so-called reverse Kirkwood–Buff (reverse-KB) theory, due to Arieh Ben-Naim, derives molecular details from thermodynamic (bulk) measurements. This advancement allows the use of the KB formalism to formulate predictions regarding microscopic properties on the basis of macroscopic information.

The radial distribution function 

The radial distribution function (RDF), also termed the pair distribution function or the pair correlation function, is a measure of local structuring in a mixture.

 

Necessarily, it also follows that:

 

Assuming spherical symmetry, the RDF reduces to:

 

where  is the inter-particle distance.

In certain cases, it is useful to quantify the intermolecular correlations in terms of free energy. Specifically, the RDF is related to the potential of mean force (PMF) between the two components by:

 

where the PMF is essentially a measure of the effective interactions between the two components in the solution.

The Kirkwood–Buff integrals 

 

which in the case of spherical symmetry reduces to:

KBI, having units of volume per molecule, quantifies the excess (or deficiency) of particle  around particle .

Derivation of thermodynamic quantities

Two-component system 
It is possible to derive various thermodynamic relations for a two-component mixture in terms of the relevant KBI (and ).

The partial molar volume of component 1 is:

 

where  is the molar concentration and naturally 

The compressibility, satisfies:

 

The derivative of the osmotic pressure, with respect to the concentration of component 2:

 

where  is the chemical potential of component 1.

The derivatives of chemical potentials with respect to concentrations, at constant temperature and pressure are:

 

 

or alternatively, with respect to mole fraction:

The preferential interaction coefficient 
The relative preference of a molecular species to solvate (interact) with another molecular species is quantified using the preferential interaction coefficient, . Lets consider a solution that consists of the solvent (water), solute, and cosolute. The relative (effective) interaction of water with the solute is related to the preferential hydration coefficient, which is positive if the solute is "preferentially hydrated". In the Kirkwood-Buff theory frame-work, and in the low concentration regime of cosolutes, the preferential hydration coefficient is:

 

where  is the molarity of water, and W, S, and C correspond to water, solute, and cosolute, respectively.

In the most general case, the preferential hydration is a function of the KBI of solute with both solvent and cosolute. However, under very simple assumptions and in many practical examples, it reduces to:

 

References

External links
 
 
 

Thermodynamic equations
Statistical mechanics